A divorcee is a person who has been divorced, whose marriage has been legally dissolved before death, ended in divorce; a male divorcé or female divorcée.

Divorcee, divorcé, or variation, may also refer to:

The Divorcee (1919 film), 1919 American silent film starring Ethel Barrymore
The Divorcée (1926 film), a German 1926 film
The Divorcee, a 1930 film directed by Robert Z. Leonard
The Divorcée, a German 1953 film
Die geschiedene Frau, an operetta in three acts by Leo Fall

See also

 The Gay Divorcee (1934 film), a 1934 U.S. musical film directed by Mark Sandrich
 Wallis Simpson, the Duchess of Windsor (1896–1986; born Bessie Wallis Warfield), nicknamed "The American Divorcée"

Divorce (disambiguation)